The following events occurred in February 1962:

February 1, 1962 (Thursday)
The Soviet Union and Ghana ratified a $42,000,000,000 trade pact, with Soviet engineers to assist in the construction of new industries and railroad lines in the West African nation. 
U.S. President John F. Kennedy delivered "the first presidential message entirely devoted to public welfare", proposing that federal aid to the poor be extended to include job training programs and day care for children of working parents.
NASA Headquarters announced that John Glenn's Mercury 6 mission would be launched no earlier than February 13, and that repair of the Atlas launch vehicle fuel tank leak would be completed well before that time.
Died:
Westropp Bennett, 95, Irish politician 
Elise Cowen, 28, American poet and girlfriend of Allen Ginsberg, by suicide

February 2, 1962 (Friday)
Three U.S. Air Force officers were killed when their Fairchild C-123 Provider became the first USAF plane to be lost in Vietnam, as the U.S. carried out Operation Ranch Hand. The cause of the crash was not determined, although the concern, that it was shot down by Communist insurgents, led to orders that the defoliant spraying aircraft receive a fighter escort.
The Soviet Union conducted its very first underground nuclear test. Previously, the Soviets had conducted all of their atomic and hydrogen bomb explosions in the atmosphere, including more than fifty since ending a moratorium on testing.
Pope John XXIII announced the date for "Vatican II", the first worldwide conclave of the Roman Catholic Church in almost 100 years, to begin in Rome on October 11.

Uelses was assisted by use of a pole made of fiberglass. After Cornelius Warmerdam cleared  in 1942, the  barrier had been pursued for more than twenty years.
The last underground shift was worked at the colliery in Radcliffe, Northumberland.
Died: Alexander Lion, 91, co-founder of the German scout movement

February 3, 1962 (Saturday)
The United States embargo against Cuba was announced by President Kennedy, prohibiting "the importation into the United States of all goods of Cuban origin and all goods imported from or through Cuba". Presidential Proclamation 3447 was made pursuant to the Foreign Assistance Act of 1961, "effective 12:01 A.M., Eastern Standard Time, February 7, 1962".
At 7:05 am Indian Standard Time (0135 UTC), a "doomsday period" (as predicted by Hindu astrologers) began. It was reported that the astrologers had predicted that on Saturday, Sunday and Monday, the earth would be "bathed in the blood of thousands of kings" because of the alignment of six planets, the Earth, the Sun and the Moon. In Britain, Aetherias Society director Keith Robertson spent the next day awaiting disaster, along with many of the society's members. He had forecast that "very soon the world will do a 'big flip' when the poles will change places with the equator... 75 percent of the world's population will be killed", but the alignment and eclipse ended without any notable disaster.
U.S. wrestlers Luther Lindsay & Ricky Waldo defeated Toyonobori & Rikidōzan in Tokyo to win the All Asia Tag Team Championship.

February 4, 1962 (Sunday)

The St. Jude Children's Research Hospital opened in Memphis, Tennessee, United States. American comedian Danny Thomas, the hospital's founder, told a crowd of 9,000 that "If I were to die this minute, I would know why I was born... Anyone may dream, but few have realized a dream as gargantuan as this one." Thomas said that he had made a vow in 1937, when he was unemployed and penniless, that he would build a shrine to Saint Jude Thaddaeus (patron saint of the lost and helpless) "if I made good". After becoming successful, he began raising funds in 1951. Fifty years later, the hospital was treating 7,800 children per year at no cost, and funding cancer research worldwide.
Gnostic Philosopher Samael Aun Weor declared February 4, 1962, to be the beginning of the "Age of Aquarius", heralded by the alignment of the first six planets, the Sun, the Moon, and the constellation Aquarius.
The Sunday Times became the first paper in the United Kingdom to print a colour supplement. At the time that the Colour Section was introduced, such supplements "were already commonplace in North America".
Born: Clint Black, American country music singer, in Long Branch, New Jersey
Died: Jacob Kramer, 69, UK-based Ukrainian painter

February 5, 1962 (Monday)
During a solar eclipse, an extremely rare grand conjunction of the classical planets occurred, for the first time since 1821. It included all 5 of the naked-eye planets plus the Sun and Moon), all of them within 16° of one another on the ecliptic. Saturn, Jupiter, Mars and Venus were on one side of the Sun, while Mercury and Earth were on the opposite side. When the Moon crossed between the Earth and the Sun, the eclipse was visible over India, where predictions of the world's end had been made.
According to famous psychic Jeane Dixon, a child was born "somewhere in the Middle East", who would "revolutionize the world and eventually unite all warring creeds and sects into one all-embracing faiths", and who would bring peace on Earth by 1999. The prediction, which did not come true as scheduled, was published in A Gift of Prophecy, the 1965 biography of Dixon by Ruth Montgomery.
French President Charles de Gaulle informed the nation that he was negotiating with the FLN for the independence of Algeria, conditional on a guarantee of the rights of "the minority of European origin in Algerian activities", and "an effective association" between Algeria and France.

Hours before the Beatles were scheduled to play at the Cavern Club, drummer Pete Best told his fellow musicians that he was ill and would be unable to appear. Determined not to cancel the show, the group called around for a replacement and Ringo Starr, whose group had the day off, appeared in Best's place.
In the Five Nations rugby union championship, England defeated Ireland 16-0 at Twickenham. Willie John McBride made his international debut in the match.
Born: Jennifer Jason Leigh, American actress, in Hollywood, as Jennifer Leigh Morrow, daughter of actor Vic Morrow and screenwriter Barbara Turner
Died: Jacques Ibert, 71, French composer

February 6, 1962 (Tuesday)
The Warner Brothers studio outbid MGM for the movie rights to produce the Broadway hit musical, My Fair Lady, for the unprecedented price of USD$5,500,000. The deal included an agreement to pay the play's owners 47.5% of any gross revenues over $20,000,000 and a 5% of the distributors' gross to the estate of George Bernard Shaw, upon whose play Pygmalion, the Lerner & Loewe musical had been based. The bid was more than twice the old record, $2,270,000 paid by 20th Century Fox in 1958 for the rights to South Pacific.
Spain selected its entry for the Eurovision Song Contest 1962; the winner was Víctor Balaguer with the song "Llámame", selected by representatives of regional radio stations.
The city of Memphis, Tennessee, ordered the desegregation of its lunch counters, formerly limited to white customers only. 
Negotiations between U.S. Steel and the United States Department of Commerce began.
Born: Axl Rose, American rock musician, as William Bruce Rose, Jr., in Lafayette, Indiana
Died: Candido Portinari, 58, Brazilian painter, of lead poisoning from paint

February 7, 1962 (Wednesday)
A coal mine explosion in Saarland, West Germany killed 299 people. The blast occurred at the coal mine, located near Völklingen, at around 9:00 am.
The United States Air Force announced that in the first 15 years of its Project Blue Book investigation of U.F.O. sightings, there was no evidence that any of the 7,369 unidentified flying object reports indicated a threat to national security, any technological advances "beyond the range of our present day scientific knowledge", and no sign of "extraterrestrial vehicles under intelligent controls".
The United States government ban against all U.S.-related Cuban imports (and nearly all exports) went into effect at one minute after midnight. The next day, the Supreme Soviet of the U.S.S.R. approved a $133 million program of military aid to Cuba, after having delayed action on it for four months.
Sam Snead won the Royal Poinciana Plaza Invitational, a tournament sponsored by the Ladies Professional Golf Association, where he was the lone man competing against 14 women pros. Snead, who had lost the tournament the year before to Louise Suggs, finished five strokes ahead of Mary Kathryn "Mickey" Wright. Snead is the only man to ever win an official LPGA Tour event.
Born:
Garth Brooks, American country musician (as Troyal Garth Brooks) in Tulsa, Oklahoma 
David Bryan, American musician and keyboard player for Bon Jovi, in Perth Amboy, New Jersey 
Eddie Izzard, British comedian, in Colony of Aden (now part of the Republic of Yemen)

February 8, 1962 (Thursday)
A demonstration against the Organisation armée secrète (OAS), called for by the PCF (Communist Party), was repressed at the Charonne metro station. Nine members of the Confédération Générale du Travail trade union were crushed to death after police chased a crowd down into the gates that closed off the subway station, in an event later called the "Charonne massacre".
The United States and the United Kingdom announced an agreement between the two nations to allow the U.S. to test nuclear weapons at Christmas Island, a British possession in the Pacific Ocean.
The British government announced that it would grant independence to Jamaica effective August 6, 1962.
Born: Malorie Blackman, English author of Barbadian parentage; in Clapham, London

February 9, 1962 (Friday)
The Taiwan Stock Exchange began trading, with shares of 18 companies available for purchase and sale. Within 40 years, the number had increased to 584.
Spain requested admission to the European Economic Community. Its membership would not be approved until 1986.

February 10, 1962 (Saturday)

At 8:52 a.m. local time, captured American spy pilot Francis Gary Powers was exchanged for captured Soviet spy Rudolf Abel in Berlin, at the Glienicke Bridge between Wannsee and Potsdam. Powers had been shot down over Russia on May 1, 1960 while flying a U-2 spyplane. Abel had been arrested in New York on June 21, 1957. Frederic L. Pryor, a 28-year-old American student who had been arrested in East Berlin on August 25, was released as part of the deal as well.
Born: Cliff Burton, American bass guitarist for Metallica; in Castro Valley, California (killed in accident, 1986)

February 11, 1962 (Sunday)
Negotiations, between the government of France and Algerian independence leaders, opened at Les Rousses, a remote village in the French Alps, leading to a preliminary agreement on a transitional government.
Comedian June Carter became a permanent part of the tour of country music singer Johnny Cash, starting with a stop at Des Moines. The two would marry in 1968.
The UK selected its entry for the 1962 Eurovision Song Contest from a shortlist of 12. The winner was "Ring-a-ding Girl" sung by Ronnie Carroll.
Born:
Tammy Baldwin, first female U.S. Representative from Wisconsin; in Madison, Wisconsin
Sheryl Crow, American singer-songwriter; in Kennett, Missouri
Sandra Tsing Loh, American actress, performance artist and writer; in Malibu, California

February 12, 1962 (Monday)
The largest air search effort ever made in New Zealand commenced with the disappearance of five people on a scenic flight from Christchurch to Milford Sound. No trace of the aircraft, a Dragonfly ZK-AFB, has ever been found.
Communist China created its first military aerobatics team of nine Shenyang J-5 airplanes of the People's Liberation Army Air Force, now referred to as the "August 1 Team" in honor of the founding of the PLAAF.
The body of British aviator Bill Lancaster was discovered almost 29 years after he had disappeared over the Sahara in the Southern Cross Minor. Lancaster had last been seen on April 12, 1933, when he took off from Reggane in French Algeria.
Six members of the Committee of 100 of the Campaign for Nuclear Disarmament were found guilty of a breach of the Official Secrets Act.
Spike Milligan's and John Antrobus's play, The Bed-Sitting Room, premièred at the Marlowe Theatre in Canterbury.

February 13, 1962 (Tuesday)
A crowd of at least 150,000 people, and perhaps as many as 500,000 marched in Paris in the first massive protest against the continuing Algerian war, which had gone into its eighth year. The occasion was the funeral ceremony for five of the nine people who had been killed by police in the Charonne metro station the previous Thursday. With many of the participants walking off of their jobs to protest, business in Paris and much of France was brought to a halt.
Born: May Sweet, Myanmar singer and actress; in Rangoon, Burma (now Yangon, Myanmar)
Died: Hugh Dalton, 74, Welsh politician and former British Chancellor of the Exchequer

February 14, 1962 (Wednesday)
A Tour of the White House with Mrs. John F. Kennedy, produced by CBS News and hosted by American First Lady Jacqueline Kennedy and CBS reporter Charles Collingwood, was broadcast on television by CBS and on NBC at 10:00 pm Eastern time. Attracting 46,000,000 TV viewers, or three out of every four households in America, it was the highest rated television program up to that time. ABC television, which did not wish to share the $100,000 production cost for the commercial-free special, showed Naked City instead, and ran the program the following Sunday.
Unfavorable weather conditions caused John Glenn's space launch to be postponed.

February 15, 1962 (Thursday)
The Soviet Union restored the death penalty, for rape and for "attacks on police and public order volunteers". Capital punishment had been officially abolished nationwide on May 26, 1947, but gradually reintroduced for various crimes beginning in 1950.
Urho Kekkonen was re-elected president of Finland. Kekkonen received 199 of 300 electoral votes, after winning the popular vote on January 15. Communist Party candidate was second, with 62 votes, and Social Democratic candidate Rafael Paasio got 37.
In Elisabethville (now Lubumbashi), the legislature for the Republic of Katanga voted to ratify President Moise Tshombe's declaration that the breakaway state should end its secession and return to the Republic of the Congo.
The Space Systems Division of the U.S. Air Force issued a Technical Operating Plan to Aerospace Corporation, El Segundo, California, for support of the Gemini Launch Vehicle Program; a contract followed on March 15. Aerospace was to assume responsibility for general systems engineering and technical direction of the development of the launch vehicle and its associated subsystems. Aerospace had already established a Gemini Launch Vehicle Program Office in January.
Born:
Milo Đukanović, first President of Montenegro (1998-2002), and Prime Minister of Montenegro on multiple occasions between 1991 and 2010; in Nikšić, SR Montenegro, Yugoslavia
June Marina Oswald, daughter of Lee Harvey Oswald and Marina Oswald; in Minsk, U.S.S.R.
Died: Menen Asfaw, 72, consort of Emperor Haile Selassie of Ethiopia

February 16, 1962 (Friday)
Voting in India's national parliamentary election commenced, with 210 million voters going to the polls. There were 14,744 candidates for the 494 seats in the Lok Sabha and the 2,930 seats in the legislatures of 13 Indian states. The final result was that 119,904,284 eligible voters participated, and the Indian National Congress, led by Prime Minister Jawaharlal Nehru, won 361 (or about 73%) of the seats. The Communist Party of India was a distant second with 29 seats (6%).
Rioters in British Guiana (now Guyana) set fire to much of the capital city of Georgetown, as Guianans of African descent attacked those of Indian descent. British troops were sent in to restore order.
U.S. President Kennedy issued nine Executive Orders, numbered 10095 to 11105, delegating "emergency preparedness functions" for various federal agencies and departments, to be implemented in the event of a national emergency that required a declaration of martial law.
Walter C. Williams, Project Mercury Operations Director, announced that because of weather conditions February 20 would be the earliest date that the Mercury-Atlas 6 mission could be launched.
Died: Frank Prewett, 68, Canadian poet

February 17, 1962 (Saturday)

In the North Sea flood of 1962, Hurricane-force winds and heavy rains swept across West Germany's North Sea coast and sent the waters flooding over the seawalls. There were 345 deaths in West Germany, 281 of them in Hamburg, when the Elbe River overflowed. An estimated 500,000 people were left homeless.
Richard Helms replaced Richard M. Bissell, Jr., as Director of the National Clandestine Service, a department of the U.S. Central Intelligence Agency. Helms would, in 1966, become the Director of Central Intelligence.
U.S. Secretary of Defense Robert S. McNamara outlined the doctrine of flexible response, the nuclear strategy of the Kennedy administration, in an address to the American Bar Foundation in Chicago. The plan called for building a large enough nuclear arsenal that the United States would have the ability to launch a second strike of nuclear missiles against the Soviets even after an initial exchange of destruction.
After being rejected by both her lover, Richard Burton, and her husband, Eddie Fisher, actress Elizabeth Taylor attempted suicide by taking an overdose of Seconal sleeping pills. She was saved after being rushed to the Salvator Mundi Hospital in Rome, where she and Burton were filming Cleopatra. The 20th Century Fox studio invented a cover story that Taylor had become seriously ill from food poisoning. 
Born:
David McComb, Australian rock musician for The Triffids; in Perth (d. 1999)
Lou Diamond Phillips, American actor and director; as Lou Diamond Upchurch, at Subic Bay U.S. Naval Station in the Philippines;
Died:
Joseph Kearns, an American actor who portrayed "Mr. Wilson" on the Dennis the Menace TV series, died at the age of 55 after collapsing from a cerebral hemorrhage the previous Sunday. Ironically, the plot for that Sunday evening's episode, "Where There's a Will", dealt with Kearns's character convinced that he had only a short time to live.
Bruno Walter, 85, German orchestral conductor

February 18, 1962 (Sunday)
Two pilots of the French Air Force, described as "renegades", defied orders, broke away from a routine mission over French Algeria, flew their planes across the border into Morocco, and then attacked a rebel camp in the city of Oujda with rockets and machine gun fire. The two, believed to be members of the Organisation armée secrète, then flew their planes to Saïda, Algeria, landed, and deserted.
At the 1962 NHRA Winternationals, Carol Cox became the first woman allowed to race at a National Hot Rod Association (NHRA) event. She won one of the featured drag race competitions, the Super Stock, automatic transmission (S/SA) event.
Died:
Salah Salem, 41, Egyptian government official who helped lead the overthrow of King Farouk and was later a top adviser to President Nasser, died of chronic kidney disease 
Baron Long, 78, American hotelier gambling tycoon and operator of the Agua Caliente Racetrack and the Agua Caliente Casino and Hotel

February 19, 1962 (Monday)
CIA Director John A. McCone established the Directorate of Science & Technology as the Directorate of Research, part of McCone's reorganization of the Central Intelligence Agency.
Howard W. Tindall, Jr. of NASA's Flight Operations Division requested consolidation of all Project Gemini computer programming and operation at Manned Spacecraft Center in Houston, with no further Gemini work to be done at the Goddard Space Flight Center (which handled the Mercury program) in  Greenbelt, Maryland. Tindall also recommended a single-source contract with International Business Machines Corporation to equip the facility.
The initial coordination meeting between Gemini Project Office and McDonnell Aircraft was held at Manned Spacecraft Center (MSC) in Houston. After five introduction sessions, regular three-day-a-week business meetings would begin on March 5.
AiResearch Manufacturing Company, a division of the Garrett Corporation, received a $15 million subcontract to manufacture the environmental control system (ECS) for the Gemini spacecraft. The Gemini ECS consisted of suit, cabin, and coolant circuits, and an oxygen supply, all designed to be manually controlled whenever possible during all phases of flight. Primary functions of the ECS were controlling suit and cabin atmosphere, controlling suit and equipment temperatures, and providing drinking water for the crew and storage or disposal of waste water.
Rock musician Chuck Berry reported to the Federal Penitentiary in Terre Haute, Indiana, after his conviction for violating the Mann Act (in 1959) was affirmed. After serving 20 months of his three-year sentence, he would be released on October 18, 1963, and revive his career.
A penumbral lunar eclipse took place.
The town of Houghton, Iowa, was incorporated.
Born:
Hana Mandlíková, Czech-born Australian tennis player, winner of Australian Open (1980 and 1987), French Open (1981) and U.S. Open singles (1985) and doubles (1989); in Prague, Czechoslovakia
Germán Vargas Lleras, Vice President of Colombia 2014—2017; in Bogotá 
Died: Edouard Dethier, 76, Belgian violinist and teacher

February 20, 1962 (Tuesday)

Mercury-Atlas 6:
John Glenn became the first U.S. astronaut to be launched into orbit, as Mercury 6 lifted off from Cape Canaveral at 9:47 a.m. local time (1447 UTC) and attained orbit at 9:59 (1459 UTC). An estimated 60 million persons viewed the launch on live television. After three circuits of the Earth, Glenn's spacecraft left orbit at 2:20 p.m. Glenn would return to outer space more than 35 years later, on October 29, 1998, at the age of 77, becoming the oldest human to orbit the Earth.
The basic objectives of Project Mercury had been reached, with a human put into Earth orbit, his reactions to space environment observed, and his safe return to Earth to a point where he could be readily found. Before the flight, there had been concern about the psychological effects of prolonged weightlessness. To the contrary, there were no debilitating or harmful effects; Glenn found zero gravity conditions handy in performing his tasks, and felt exhilarated during his four and a half hours of weightlessness. One of the interesting sidelights of the Glenn flight was his report of "fire flies" when he entered the sunrise portion of an orbit. For several months, the phenomenon remained a mystery, until the May 24 Mercury 7 mission when Scott Carpenter accidentally tapped the spacecraft wall with his hand, releasing many of the so-called "fire flies." The source was determined to be frost from the reaction control jets.
During the flight two major problems were encountered: (1) a yaw attitude control jet apparently clogged, forcing the astronaut to abandon the automatic control system for the manual-electrical fly-by-wire system and the manual-mechanical system; and (2) a faulty switch in the heat shield circuit indicated that the clamp holding the shield had been prematurely released - a signal later found to be false. During reentry, however, the retropack was not jettisoned but retained as a safety measure to hold the heat shield in place in the event it had loosened.
Five days after making both rape and attacks on police subject to capital punishment, the Soviet Union restored the death penalty for persons convicted of accepting bribes. Females were exempt from the death penalty under any circumstances, as were men who had reached the age of 60 by the time of their sentencing.
Died: Martin Lewis, 80, Australian-American artist

February 21, 1962 (Wednesday)
Former Soviet Foreign Minister Dmitri Shepilov was expelled from the Soviet Communist Party, in retaliation for his role in a 1957 attempt to oust Nikita Khrushchev from power. 
On the day after John Glenn's historic flight, Soviet Premier Khrushchev sent a telegram to U.S. President Kennedy, proposing that the two nations co-operate on their space program. The first joint venture would take place in 1975.
The first Samos-F satellite, also referred to as a "ferret satellite" because of its purpose of monitoring Soviet missiles and seeking out information, was launched from Cape Canaveral.
A metal fragment, identified by numbers stamped on it as a part of the Atlas that boosted Mercury-Atlas 6 (MA-6) into orbit, landed on a farm in South Africa after about 8 hours in orbit.
Margot Fonteyn and Rudolf Nureyev first danced together, in a Royal Ballet performance of Giselle at Covent Garden in London, creating one of the greatest partnerships in the history of dance. Nureyev had defected from the U.S.S.R. almost eight months earlier on June 16, 1961. He and Fonteyn received 23 curtain calls from the audience.
Born:
Chuck Palahniuk, American novelist; in Pasco, Washington
David Foster Wallace, American novelist; in Ithaca, New York (d. 2008)

February 22, 1962 (Thursday)
Pope John XXIII signed Veterum sapientia ("Ancient Wisdom") as an apostolic constitution, the highest possible papal decree. The declaration, published the next day, directed that Roman Catholic seminary students should not only be instructed on the use of the Latin language, but that lectures should be given in Latin, "a bond of unity between the Christian peoples of Europe". The Pope also prohibited priests from arguing against the use of Latin, and created an institute to create new words in Contemporary Latin to keep it apace of modern developments. In 1963, the second Vatican council would approve an order retaining Latin for specific rituals, but native languages for most other purposes.
Pope John XXIII made Sant'Atanasio in Rome a titular church as a seat for Cardinals.
In Colombia, 40 train passengers were killed and 67 injured in a collision with a freight trainnear Cali.
Martin-Baltimore submitted its initial proposal for the redesign of the Gemini launch vehicle.
Born: Steve Irwin, Australian naturalist and broadcaster; in Essendon, Victoria (killed in 2006 accident)

February 23, 1962 (Friday)

Astronaut John Glenn arrived in Cape Canaveral to a hero's welcome and was reunited with his family for the first time since before going into space. U.S. President John F. Kennedy, for whom Cape Canaveral would be renamed temporarily during the 1960s and early 1970s, greeted Glenn and personally awarded the NASA Distinguished Service Medal to Glenn and Robert R. Gilruth. Kennedy praised Glenn for "professional skill, unflinching courage and extraordinary ability to perform a most difficult task under physical stress." It was then that Glenn revealed in an interview that the heat shield on his capsule began to break up upon re-entry, the loss of which would have been fatal. Glenn calmly said, "it could have been a bad day for everybody".
Born: Lise Haavik, Norwegian singer; in Narvik
Died: James Halliday McDunnough, 84, Canadian entomologist who identified almost 1,500 different species of butterflies in North America

February 24, 1962 (Saturday)
The United States government began its first telephone and television transmissions via satellite, bouncing signals off Echo 1, which had been launched on August 12, 1960.

North American Aviation's Rocketdyne Division was awarded a $32 million subcontract to build two separate liquid propulsion systems for the Gemini spacecraft, the orbit attitude and maneuvering system (OAMS) and the reentry control system (RCS). 
Born: Michelle Shocked (stage name for Karen Michelle Johnston), American singer-songwriter; in Dallas
Died:
Hu Shih, 70, Chinese philosopher
Henrik Sørensen, 80, Norwegian expressionist painter

February 25, 1962 (Sunday)
The Judy Garland Show, a one-time special, appeared on CBS and received a 49.5 rating, the highest rating CBS had had for a variety show to that time. The success of the special led to a weekly series in 1963, which CBS cancelled after a year because of low ratings.
Inspection of Atlas launch vehicle 107-D, designated for the May 24 Mercury 7 mission of Scott Carpenter, was conducted at the Convair Division of General Dynamics in San Diego.
Born: Birgit Fischer, German kayaker; Olympic gold medalist in 1980 and 1988, and world champion 1978-79, 1981–83, 1985 and 1987 for East Germany; Olympic gold medalist 1992, 1996, 2000 and 2004 and world champion 1993-95, 1997-98 for united Germany; in Brandenburg an der Havel, East Germany

February 26, 1962 (Monday)
The Irish Republican Army officially called off its five-year Border Campaign in Northern Ireland. In press releases dropped off at newspapers there as well as in Ireland, the IRA publicity bureau wrote, "The Leadership of the Resistance Movement has ordered the termination of 'The Campaign of Resistance to British Occupation'... all arms and other materials have been dumped and all full-time active service volunteers have been withdrawn." With the exception of a series of 17 bank robberies to finance the organization, the IRA violence halted until 1969.

John Glenn Day in Washington, D.C., featured the reception of the astronaut at the White House, a parade, and his address to a joint session of the United States Congress.
Born: Etienne Ys, Prime Minister of the Netherlands Antilles 2002—2003 and 2004—2006; in Curaçao
Died: Chic Johnson, 70, American comedian who had been half of the popular vaudeville act of Olsen and Johnson and creator of the musical revue Hellzapoppin (musical)

February 27, 1962 (Tuesday)
Sublieutenant Nguyễn Văn Cử and Lt. Phạm Phú Quốc, two South Vietnamese members of the Republic of Vietnam Air Force, diverted from their combat mission south of Saigon and dropped bombs upon the presidential palace in an attempt to assassinate South Vietnamese President Ngô Đình Diệm. One of the  bombs landed in the room where the President and his advisers were but failed to detonate because it had been dropped from too low an altitude to arm itself. Quốc was arrested after being forced to land, while Cử fled to neighboring Cambodia. Both men would be reinstated to the Air Force after Diem's assassination in 1963.
An explosion at the Tito Coal Mine in Banovici, in the Bosnia republic of Yugoslavia, trapped 177 miners underground. Rescuers were able to save 123 of the men, but 54 were trapped inside and died.
The United Kingdom's House of Commons voted 277-170 in favor of the Commonwealth Immigrants Act 1962, designed to limit the immigration into Great Britain by residents of India, Pakistan, and the West Indies.
After getting word that U.S. Attorney General Robert F. Kennedy was preparing to fire him from his job as Director of the FBI, J. Edgar Hoover gave the Attorney General a memorandum of an FBI investigation of Judith Exner, noting that she had made phone calls to the private line of Robert's brother, U.S. President John F. Kennedy. Hoover remained FBI Director until his death in 1972.
Born: Adam Baldwin, American actor; in Chicago
Died: Willie Best, 45, American actor

February 28, 1962 (Wednesday)
The presence of American nuclear missiles in a nation bordering the U.S.S.R. became an issue eight months later during the Cuban Missile Crisis, when Soviet nuclear missiles were brought to Cuba, within striking distance of the United States. The missiles would be withdrawn from both Turkey and Cuba following the crisis.
The Beatles appeared at the Cavern Club in Liverpool on a triple bill with Gerry & the Pacemakers and Johnny Sandon and the Searchers.
Professor Claudio Sánchez-Albornoz y Menduiña of the University of Buenos Aires was given the honorary title of Prime Minister of the Spanish Republican government in Exile. He would hold the position for nine years.

References

1962
1962-02
1962-02